Michael Craig Folk (born in Martinsburg, West Virginia) is an American politician from West Virginia. A Republican, he was formerly a member of the West Virginia House of Delegates, representing District 63.

Education
Folk is a graduate of Hedgesville High School. He earned his Bachelor of Science degree in economics from Shepherd College (now Shepherd University) and his master of business administration from West Virginia University.

Elections
2012: Folk ran in the May 8, 2012 Republican Primary and won by 17 votes with 485 votes (51.4%), and won the November 6, 2012 General election with 3,096 votes (51.2%) against Democratic nominee Donn Marshall, who had run for a seat in 2010.
2014: Folk won re-election to the 63rd District, defeating Heather Marshall — wife of his 2012 opponent — by receiving 60.99% of the vote.
2016: Folk won a third term in the House by defeating Democratic challenger Kenneth Lemaster, receiving 58.5% of the vote.
2018: Folk sought election to the West Virginia Senate in the 16th district, but was defeated by incumbent John Unger.

Candidacy for Governor
On February 5, 2019, Folk announced he would challenge West Virginia Governor Jim Justice in the state's 2020 primary elections.

Controversy
On July 15, 2016, Folk tweeted that Hillary Clinton should be "hung on the Mall in Washington, DC" in response to her email controversy. He later stated that he regretted the comment, but reiterated his belief that Clinton should be tried for treason. Two days later, Folk was suspended from his job as a pilot for United Airlines over the comment.

References

External links
Official page at the West Virginia Legislature
Campaign site
  Profile on Project VoteSmart
Michael Folk at Ballotpedia
Michael (Mike) Folk at the National Institute on Money in State Politics

21st-century American politicians
Living people
Republican Party members of the West Virginia House of Delegates
Politicians from Martinsburg, West Virginia
Shepherd University alumni
West Virginia University alumni
Year of birth missing (living people)
Candidates in the 2020 United States elections